Secrets of a Model is a 1940 American drama film directed by Sam Newfield and starring Cheryl Walker, Harold Daniels and Phyllis Barry. It was made as an independent exploitation film on Poverty Row.

Synopsis
In order to raise money for her mother's operation, waitress  Rita Wilson turns to modelling for a sculpture. She encounters the wealthy Jack Thorndyke and after getting drunk at a party at his penthouse apartment, he takes advantage of her. She contracts a mystery illness and Jack refuses all her calls. She goes through a succession of increasing dead-end jobs and then faints in the street. Waking up in hospital she is reunited with her old boyfriend milkman Bob Grey. After recovering and agreeing to marry Bob, she now discovers that Jack Thorndyke is now trying the same tricks on her former roommate Sally.

Cast
 Cheryl Walker as Rita Wilson
 Harold Daniels as Jack Thorndyke
 Julian Madison as 	Bob Grey
 Phyllis Barry as Sally Adams
 Bobby Watson as Stuart Bannerman
 Grace Lenard as 	Jo Jo
 Eddie Borden as Customer 
 Donald Kerr as Drunk at Party

References

Bibliography
 Pitts, Michael R. Poverty Row Studios, 1929–1940. McFarland & Company, 2005.

External links
 

1940 films
1940 drama films
American drama films
American black-and-white films
Films directed by Sam Newfield
1940s English-language films
1940s American films